Heyday is an independent nonprofit publisher based in Berkeley, California.

Heyday was founded by Malcolm Margolin in 1974 when he wrote, typeset, designed, and distributed The East Bay Out, a guide to the natural history of the hills and bay shore in and round Berkeley and Oakland, in the East Bay of the San Francisco Bay Area. Heyday publishes around twenty books a year, as well as the quarterly magazine News from Native California.

In 2004, they merged with their nonprofit wing, the Clapperstick Institute, and became a full-fledged 501(c)(3) nonprofit enterprise. In 2016, Margolin retired from Heyday, and Steve Wasserman, previously editor-in-chief of the Los Angeles Times Book Review and an editor-at-large at Yale University Press, became Margolin's successor as publisher and executive director. Since 2020, the company has been co-led by Wasserman, publisher, and longtime staff member Gayle Wattawa, now general manager.

The Berkeley Roundhouse 
The Berkeley Roundhouse, also known as the California Indian Publishing Program (CIPP), focuses on California Native Peoples. The Roundhouse hosts Native events and provides literature to under-served Native community members. Since 1987, Heyday has published the quarterly magazine News from Native California, which is written from a Native People's perspective.

Partnerships 
Heyday is a frequent partner with other California cultural organizations. Heyday co-founded the California Historical Society Press with the California Historical Society, which together have published several books. Heyday has produced books in conjunction with the California Council for the Humanities; the California State Library; the Bancroft Library at the University of California, Berkeley; the Oakland Museum of California; the Commonwealth Club of California; Santa Clara University; the California Academy of Sciences; the Japanese American National Museum; and the Yosemite Association (now Yosemite Conservancy).

Working with the California Legacy Project at Santa Clara University, Heyday produced the California Legacy series, which focused on California's literary and cultural heritage. In partnership with the Inlandia Institute at the Riverside Public Library, Heyday published books on the Inland Empire in Southern California. Heyday has also published books on Yosemite National Park, and the Sierra Nevada, for the park.

Sierra College Press 
Heyday Books partially funds the Sierra College Press, a university press associated with Sierra College, located in Rocklin, California. The presswhich was founded in 2002 and is one of the few in the United States operated by a community collegepublishes journals and books, most of which have a focus on the Sierra Nevada region.

Events 
Heyday sponsors over two hundred events annually. Three of Heyday's books have served as the basis for PBS documentaries. Heyday organizes talks, readings, workshops, presentations and displays across the state, and has additionally held events in fourteen states and three countries.

Museum exhibits 
Heyday's titles have launched, or have accompanied, numerous museum exhibitions. More than twenty books published by Heyday have been adapted into exhibits and museum shows, at such venues as the Oakland Museum of California and the Autry National Center.

Awards

Book awards 
 ALA Notable Book, American Library Association
 American Association for State and Local History Leadership in History Award
 American Book Award, Before Columbus Foundation
 PEN/Beyond Margins Award
 California Book Awards, Commonwealth Club, Gold Medal
 California Collection Book, California Readers Association
 Choice Magazine Outstanding Academic Title
 Commonwealth Club Award, Silver Medal
 Foreword Book of the Year Award, Bronze Medal
 Journalism Award-Media Award, American Planning Association
 Kiriyama Prize Notable Book
 National Wildlife Federation's Communicator of the Year Award
 Northern California Independent Booksellers Association Award
 PEN Oakland Josephine Miles Literary Award
 PubWest Book Design Award
 Rolling Stone Magazine Ralph J. Gleason Award
 William Carlos Williams Award, Academy of American Poets

Awards won by Margolin, as publisher
 American Book Award for Publishing/Editing, Before Columbus Foundation
 Award for Organizational Excellence, American Association for State and Local History
 California Council for the Promotion of History Award
 California Indian Heath Services Award
 Carey McWilliams Award for Lifetime Achievement, California Studies Association
 Cultural Freedom Award, Lannan Foundation (2008)
 Distinguished Service Award from the Society of Professional Journalists
 Fred Cody Award, Bay Area Book Reviewers Association
 Gerbode Fellowship
 Helen Crocker Russell Award for Community Leadership, San Francisco Foundation
 The Hubert Howe Bancroft Award, The Bancroft Library
 Martin Baumhoff Award for Achievement by the Society for California Archaeology
 The Oscar Lewis Award for Contributions to Western Society, Book Club of California
 Presidential Commendation, The Society for California Archaeology
 Publishing Award, California Horticultural Society
 Special recognition for leadership in the arts, California Arts Council

References

External links
Heyday Books official website
Bay Nature Institute

Book publishing companies based in Berkeley, California
Small press publishing companies
Magazine publishing companies of the United States
Publishing companies established in 1974
Environment of California
Non-profit organizations based in California
Culture in the San Francisco Bay Area
Indigenous peoples of California topics
Non-profit publishers